Idle Hour is a neighborhood in southeastern Lexington, Kentucky, United States. Its boundaries are Idle Hour Country Club to the north, CSX railroad tracks to the east, New Circle Road to the south, and Richmond Road to the west.

Neighborhood statistics
 Area: 
 Population: 434
 Population density: 1,975 people per square mile
 Median household income: $31,792

References

Neighborhoods in Lexington, Kentucky